Jinwoo SMC (Hangul: (주)진우에스엠씨) is a South Korean company that manufactures aerial work platforms, industrial machinery and automation equipment

History 
Jinwoo Aerial Lift (JAL) was founded in 1992, initially called Hosung Machineries. It a shifted focus to aerial lifts in 1998.

Aerial lifts and other products

The company produces platform aerial lifts mounted on either Tata Daewoo or Hyundai Heavy Automobiles, with an  range via section booms. The company also manufactures ladder lifts up to 56 meters, scissor lifts up to 22 meters and self-propelled engine-run articulated cherry picker boom lifts, with up to 26m lifting range.
Other company's products are off-road multi-purpose electric vehicles, mini breakers, mobile kitchen trucks and bridge M/C.

See also
List of South Korean companies
Economy of South Korea

References

External links

Manufacturing companies of South Korea
Manufacturing companies established in 1992
South Korean companies established in 1992
Electric vehicle manufacturers of South Korea
Engineering companies of South Korea
South Korean brands